Peter Brough (26 February 1916 – 3 June 1999) was an English radio ventriloquist who became a well-known name to audiences in the 1950s. He is associated with his puppet Archie Andrews.

Early career
Brough’s father Arthur was a ventriloquist and a frequent performer on the variety stages around London. Brough senior gave up performing in the early 1920s and concentrated on a textile business.  Young Peter left school at 15 and worked for a Bayswater department store called Whiteleys, first as an errand boy and later as a counter salesman. He emulated his father by developing his ventriloquist skills, which he continued to practice whilst working at Whiteleys. 
Early press reports show Brough entertaining the patients at Acton hospital on Christmas Day, 1935. He continued entertaining at clubs and at concerts in the Acton area and by 1939 he was becoming a regular on the variety stage. His stage performances increased and in 1941 he was described as “England's Most Successful Young Ventriloquist”.  He acted as a compere in the 1940 film Cavalcade of Variety featuring Billy Cotton and his band.

Radio days
Brough began his radio career in 1944 in ventriloquism but in 1950 he debuted Archie, a mischievous child who domineered his mentor. Archie's chief characteristics were his Savile Row-tailored blazers and manic eyes. Archie followed in the tradition of the American ventriloquist Edgar Bergen and his dummy Charlie McCarthy.

His radio series based around the character – Educating Archie – featured in support the likes of Dick Emery, Freddie Sales, Benny Hill, Tony Hancock, Hattie Jacques, Bruce Forsyth, Harry Secombe, Max Bygraves, Beryl Reid and even a young Julie Andrews as the girlfriend of Archie; Eric Sykes was one of the series' main writers in the early 1950s. The show often averaged 15 million listeners, and a fan club had 250,000 members.

Brough published his autobiography "Educating Archie" in 1955.

TV work
Because of the success of his radio show, Brough made his debut on television in 1956 in the BBC sitcom Here's Archie which co-starred Irene Handl and Ronald Chesney. The show was written by the latter and Ronald Wolfe, who would later team up on British sitcoms The Rag Trade and On the Buses.

Two years later, Brough was on ITV in Educating Archie, utilising the same team as before, although Marty Feldman took some of the writing credit as well. The TV appearances exposed his limitations as a ventriloquist, as his lips were frequently seen to move. In later years a critic  remarked, "Ventriloquism on the radio - I could have done that."

By 1961, Brough decided to retire Archie following the death of his father, also a ventriloquist, and he then took over the family's textile and menswear business. His TV appearances were sporadic from then on. He died on 3 June 1999  and was buried in Maldon cemetery in Essex.

In November 2005, the original Archie Andrews doll was sold at auction in Taunton for £34,000.

Family
Brough married twice: first in 1940 to Peggy Franklin (one son, one daughter; marriage dissolved), second to Elizabeth Chantler (died 1994; one son, one daughter).

His son Chris Brough, became a record producer and was married to the singer, actress and TV presenter Ayshea Brough in the 1970s.

His daughter, Romey Brough is an internationally collected artist with work in the Tate Gallery Archive.

See also
Archie's the Boy (radio programme)

References

External links
BBC news article about Peter Brough upon his death

1916 births
1999 deaths
English puppeteers
English radio personalities
English television personalities
People from Shepherd's Bush
British puppeteers
Ventriloquists